United Nations Security Council resolution 977, adopted unanimously on 22 February 1995, after recalling Resolution 955 (1994) in which the council was to determine the seat of the International Criminal Tribunal for Rwanda (ICTR) and noting a report by the Secretary-General Boutros Boutros-Ghali, the council decided that its seat would be in Arusha, Tanzania.

According to the Secretary-General's report, the decision signalled the second phase of the process in establishing the ICTR, which would now allow the process of selecting the six trial judges to begin. Rwanda's representative to the council Manzi Bakuramutsa said that, while his government did not support the decision to allocate the seat outside Rwanda, it would still co-operate with the security council.

See also
 List of United Nations Security Council Resolutions 901 to 1000 (1994–1995)
 Rwandan Civil War
 Rwandan genocide
 United Nations Observer Mission Uganda–Rwanda

References

External links
 
Text of the Resolution at undocs.org

 0977
1995 in Rwanda
 0977
February 1995 events